Batu Maung is a state constituency in Penang, Malaysia, that has been represented in the Penang State Legislative Assembly since 2004. It covers the southeastern corner of Penang Island, including the eponymous town of Batu Maung, the Penang International Airport and the newer parts of Bayan Lepas.

The state constituency was first contested in 2004 and is mandated to return a single Assemblyman to the Penang State Legislative Assembly under the first-past-the-post voting system. , the State Assemblyman for Batu Maung is Abdul Halim Hussain from Parti Keadilan Rakyat (PKR), which is part of the state's ruling coalition, Pakatan Harapan (PH).

Definition

Polling districts 
According to the federal gazette issued on 30 March 2018, the Batu Maung constituency is divided into 10 polling districts.

The latter is the southeastern tip of Penang Island.

This state constituency is named after the town of Batu Maung, located near Teluk Tempoyak. The state seat also encompasses the newer neighbourhoods of Bayan Lepas that grew as a result of the massive industrialisation which created the Bayan Lepas Free Industrial Zone during the latter decades of the 20th century. The southern half of this manufacturing zone, as well as the Penang International Airport, falls under this constituency.

In addition, the Batu Maung constituency contains Rimau Island, an uninhabited islet south of Penang Island.

Demographics

History

Election results 
The electoral results for the Batu Maung state constituency in 2008, 2013 and 2018 are as follows.

See also 
 Constituencies of Penang

References 

Penang state constituencies